Jalia Bintu also known as Bintu Lukumu Ngonzi Abwooli Jalia (born 20 May 1967) is a female Ugandan politician and social worker/teacher affiliated to the National Resistance Movement political party.  She is the district woman representative of Masindi district who has served in the eighth, ninth, and tenth Parliaments of Uganda.

Education background 
She completed her Grade II Teaching Certificate in 1985 from National Institute of Education, Makerere University and later enrolled for Grade III Teaching Certificate at Institute of Teacher Education Kyambogo and completed in 1989. She joined the Institute of Teacher Education Kyambogo in 1993 to pursue a diploma in education. In 1999, she completed her bachelor's degree in arts from Makerere University and returned for her Master of Arts in peace and conflict studies in 2005 from the same university.

Early life 
From 1986 to 1988, she served as a teacher at Army Barracks Public School and later joined Kamurasi Teachers College between 1993 and 1994 as a tutor. She was the vice chairperson of Uganda Women Parliamentary Association (2004-2006). She worked at the Parliament of Uganda as the vice chairperson, Committee on Commissions, Statutory Authorities and State Enterprises (COSASE) in (2001-2004) and the chairperson, Committee on Equal Opportunities (2006-2008). In 2008, she was the observer at Juba peace talks. Jalia served on several roles as the member at National Consultative Committee Fast-Tracking East African Federation (2007), commissioner at Parliamentary Commission (2011-2013), and as the chairperson, Parliamentarians SACCO at the Parliament of Uganda (2015 to date).

Political career 
From 2001 to date, she has been a member of Parliament at the Parliament of Uganda. While at the Parliament of Uganda, Jalia has served on additional role as the member on Public Accounts Committee and Committee on Agriculture.

She was named among the MPs under the NRM who have been in Parliament for two or more terms but have failed to get the party flag and lost the 2021-2026 elections. She was undecided during the voting of Constitutional Amendment Bill, which contains a clause for the removal of the age limit. Bintu said she would first consult her people before she could take a position on the matter.

Personal life 
She is married. Her hobbies are reading books, playing netball, athletics, singing and dancing. She has special interests in helping the needy, planting trees and promotion of girl child education.

See also 

 List of members of the tenth Parliament of Uganda
 List of members of the eleventh Parliament of Uganda
 List of members of the ninth Parliament of Uganda
 List of members of the eighth Parliament of Uganda
 National Resistance Movement
 Parliament of Uganda

External links 

 Website of the Parliament of Uganda
 Jalia Bintu  on Facebook
 iKNOW Politics Interview of Bintu Jalia Lukumu N Abwooli

References 

Living people
1967 births
National Resistance Movement politicians
Members of the Parliament of Uganda
Women members of the Parliament of Uganda
Uganda Management Institute alumni
Makerere University alumni
21st-century Ugandan politicians
21st-century Ugandan women politicians